La Traición (Betrayed) is a Colombian-American telenovela co-produced by United States-based Telemundo and RTI Colombia. Telemundo debuted this serial on January 7, 2008, replacing Madre Luna. This show is also known as Betrayed.

Traición is based on the Colombian novel El Caballero de Rauzán, written in 1887 by Felipe Pérez. RTI Colombia made another adaptation of the story in 2000, titled Rauzán. As with most of its soap operas, Telemundo broadcast English subtitles as closed captions on CC3.  Filming in Bogotá, Colombia, began in late October, 2007.

BTV started to air this telenovela on August 26, 2008 in Bulgaria. RTV Pink started to air this telenovela on January 26, 2009 in Serbia. TV Puls will start to air this novela on August 31, 2009 in Poland.

Story
This romantic saga features Hugo de Medina, a handsome, mysterious swordsman, with a reputation as a womanizer.  His life crashes around him when he finds he suffers from catalepsy, an incurable condition marked by loss of voluntary motion. The same disease felled his father years before.

This dashing young man meets Soledad de Obregon, a gorgeous, refined girl and the two are bound together by sudden passion, though matters are complicated by Hugo's desire to hide his infirmity.

As the adoring couple prepares to marry, tragedy strikes again.  Hugo's sinister brother, Alcides, who has always been in love with Soledad, betrays him and steals his betrothed. The rest of the telenovela deals with first Hugo's quest for vengeance and then his attempts to regain the trust and love of Soledad.

Production notes
This telenovela was originally announced with Mario Cimarro, Sandra Echeverría and Gabriel Porras as stars. Danna García replaced Echeverría and Salvador del Solar replaced Porras, who took the male lead in Madre Luna.  Telemundo began airing ads promoting this show in September, before filming began. It apparently shortened the series from the original plan of 130 to 106 episodes.

Telemundo also took a shot at rival network Univision by having Michelle Vieth appear in first-run episodes of this show, while Univision aired Al Diablo con los Guapos from 2007. This highlights that the competition rebroadcasts serials that already aired in Mexico several months ago, while Telemundo usually airs original programming. Michelle Vieth is thus one of the few soap performers to appear on competing US networks at the same time.

Cast

International releases

References

External links
  (Spanish) 
 Telenovela World (bilingual)
 Telemundo teaser trailer (Spanish with English subtitles)
 Telenovela La Traición Tribute Site (in Spanish)

2008 telenovelas
2008 American television series debuts
2008 American television series endings
2008 Colombian television series debuts
2008 Colombian television series endings
Period television series
Spanish-language American telenovelas
Colombian telenovelas
RTI Producciones telenovelas
Telemundo telenovelas